Protected persons is a legal term under international humanitarian law and refers to persons who are under specific protection of the 1949 Geneva Conventions, their 1977 Additional Protocols, and customary international humanitarian law during an armed conflict.

The legal definition of different categories of protected persons in armed conflicts is found in each 1949 Geneva Conventions and also in 1977 Additional Protocols. The extent of protection and obligations of belligerent states and parties depends on the type of the armed conflict (international or not international) as well as on the category of protected persons in terms of their age (adult/child), sex (man/woman), participation in the armed conflict (combatant/prisoner of war/civil person) and personal situation (e.g. shipwrecked, sick, wounded, etc.).

Minimum rights and fundamental guarantees are granted by the 1977 Additional Protocols I and II to the persons not covered by the 1949 Geneva Conventions, independently of the character of the conflict (international or national). Moreover, the Additional Protocol II extended the protection of existing protected persons in non-international armed conflicts (persons deprived of liberty, wounded and sick, medical and religious personnel, civilian population).

History 
In 1862 Henri Dunant published a book, A Memory of Solferino, describing his experience of the horrors of war during the Battle of Solferino. It increased the desire to improve the conditions of the wounded in armies in the field. Following the diplomatic conference inspired by his ideas and attended by the governments of Europe and several American states, the 1st Geneva Convention have been concluded in 1864 by twelve European countries.

The article 6 of this Convention already stipulated:  “Wounded or sick combatants, to whatever nation they may belong, shall be collected and cared for.”

This Convention have been replaced by the Geneva Conventions of 1906, 1929 and 1949, based on new elements occurred during the subsequent wars.

Applicable texts 
In the area of international humanitarian law, four 1949 Geneva Conventions, the 1977 Additional Protocols and customary international humanitarian law are the source of the rights and protections for various categories of persons in the context of international armed conflicts, and also non international armed conflicts. These texts are focused on protection of victims of armed conflicts and they are based on one general principle: obligation of human treatment of protected persons, without discrimination on the grounds of race, sex, nationality, language, or religion.

The Hague Conventions of 1899 and 1907 are also in force, fully applicable and constitute a part of customary international law. Even before the Geneva Conventions, they already contained a number of important provisions regarding the protection of prisoners of war (forbidden actions) and civil persons (e.g. during the occupation).

In addition, human rights law also applies to armed conflicts and protects all individuals within the jurisdiction of the state.

Protected persons associated with the armed forces 
Definition of military victim is given by the Article 13 of the 1st Geneva Convention 1949 and by the Article 4 of the 2nd Geneva Convention 1949 for the amelioration of the condition of wounded, sick and shipwrecked members of armed forces at sea. There are several sub-categories of military victims:

 wounded and sick in armed forces in the field;
 wounded, sick and shipwrecked members of armed forces at sea; the status of shipwrecked has a determined duration and can change due to the events in the sea to combatant, interned, prisoner of war (for militaries); to protected person under the Article 4 of the 4th Geneva Convention (for civilians); 
 medical and religious personnel attached to armed forces
war correspondents,.

Legal effects 
There are two types of obligations incumbent to the signatory nations under Article 12 of the 1st Geneva Convention:

 respect, protect and rescue wounded and sick militaries;
 provide treatment and care without any discrimination between them.

In addition to that, the Additional Protocol I of the Geneva Convention establishes a unitary protection for all sick, wounded and shipwrecked independently of their military or civil status. In return, sick and wounded persons shall refrain from any hostile behaviour to benefit from this protection.

In case of necessity, belligerent powers can appeal to the charity of the civilian population. That being said, the civilian population shall only “respect these wounded and sick, and in particular abstain from offering them violence”, but at the same time can not be prosecuted and convicted “for having nursed wounded or sick”.

Prisoners of war 
Legal definition of prisoners of war is given in the Article 4 of the 3rd Geneva Convention and apply to the following persons, who "have fallen into the power of the enemy":

 the regular combatants of the adversary (members of the armed forces, levée en masse, militias, members of volunteer corps, resistance movements);
 certain civilians, like civilian members of military aircraft crews; war correspondents; suppliers; members of labour units or services in charge of the welfare of the armed forces;
 members of the medical personnel chaplains who assist the prisoners of war, shall not be considered as prisoners of war. However, they have right to the protection no less favourable than the protection accorded to the prisoners of war.

Several type of persons has right to the treatment equal to the prisoners of war, without holding this status (parliamentarians, children-combatants). In case of doubt, the concerned person has a right to the presumption of status of prisoner of war, until the exact status is established by the competent court.

Persons with special status 
Four categories of persons need an additional attention:

 deserter in the hands of the adversary party shall at least be considered as a prisoner of war, but can also obtain another not less favourable status;
 betrayer in the hands of his Origin State does not have right to the status of the prisoner of war according to the international dominant practice;
 spy could be considered as a prisoner of war (combatant in uniform or resident of occupied territory) or not (civil persons or combatant without uniform);
 mercenary has no right to the status of the prisoner of war or combatant, under condition to respect a number of cumulative criteria.

Legal effects 
The 3rd Geneva Convention describes in a detailed manner the protection granted to the prisoner of war and obligations incumbent upon the belligerents:

 Humane treatment - prisoners of war shall be protected against acts of violence, intimidation, insults and public curiosity. They should be housed and receive a sufficient nourishment. Mutilations, medical and scientific experiments, removal of organs for transportation are forbidden. They have rights to quarters, food, clothing, hygiene, medical attention, property, representation and their badges of rank and nationality .
 Equal treatment – prisoners of war shall be treated without any discrimination on the basis of race, nationality, religion, opinions and similar criteria.
 Security – the prisoners of war shall be evacuated from combat and danger zone. Their quarters shall bear the and by indications clearly visible from the air.
 Labour – prisoners of war could be utilized by the Detaining power for work respecting their age, sex, rank, physical aptitude. 
 Proceedings – the Detaining power can prosecute the prisoner of war according to it own laws, regulations and orders in force. During the criminal trial, the prisoner could refuse to cooperate with the Court. Judicial proceedings against the prisoners of war shall be carried in accordance with the fair trial canons. Disciplinary measures shall be adopted rather than judicial wherever it is possible. Even after the conviction, the prisoner keeps his status of the prisoner of war. The death penalty is acceptable by the customary law and the Conventions.
 Repatriation – seriously wounded or sick prisoners of war shall be sent back to their country regardless of number or rank. The rest of prisoners of war shall be released and repatriated after the cessation of active hostilities.

Civilian persons 
The term of protected civilian persons is described in the Article 4 of the 4th Geneva Convention. It does not protect all civilian persons in general, but only those who are "in the hands of" the adverse party during the armed conflict, “persons who at a given moment and in any manner whatsoever, find themselves, in case of a conflict or occupation, in the hands of persons a Party to the conflict or Occupying Power of which they are not nationals”. In case of doubts, the persons is presumed to be civilian. It seems that the nationals of the countries who are not part of the 1949 Geneva Conventions are not protected by these texts, but given that the ratification is now universal and the role of the customary international humanitarian law, this limitation is no longer of practical reference. Neutral persons are not protected as long as “their State of nationality maintains normal diplomatic representation with the State in which they find themselves”.

Another definition is given by the Article 50 of the Additional Protocol I, but in a negative way – everybody, who does not belong to the armed forces or prisoners of war belongs to civilian population. Thus, persons that were not covered by the Geneva Conventions, have minimum protection. In fact, the protection of civilians was extended to the cases of war of national liberation.

The legal effect of the status depends on the category of civilian persons and their location (on the territory of adversary Party or on the occupied territory).

The civilians can lose the protection against the attacks, if they participate in the hostilities against the enemy.

General protection of civilian persons 
According to the 4th Geneva Convention, the rights of protected civilian persons are absolute and inalienable. As a consequence,

 parties of armed conflicts can not conclude special agreement that will "adversely affect the situation of protected persons";
 protected persons can not renounce to their rights;
 protected persons of occupied or annexed territories could not be deprived from the rights established in the Geneva Convention.

The Additional Protocol I prohibits indiscriminate attacks or reprisals against the civilian persons, their objects, and objects necessary to their survival.

There is a number of basic rights covering the civilian persons:

 Humane treatment – protected persons are “entitled, in all circumstances, to respect for their persons, their honor, their family rights, their religious convictions and practices, and their manners and customs”.They shall be protected against acts of violence, intimidation, insults and public curiosity. 
 Equal treatment – protection should be provided without any discrimination on the basis of race, nationality, religion, opinions. Health, rank, sex and age distinction are accepted.
 Security  – protected persons could not be used as a human shield. Corporal punishments, torture, murders, collective penalties and experiments are forbidden. Taking of hostages and pillage are prohibited.

In case of non international armed conflict, Article 3 of Third Geneva Convention grants basic rights to civilian persons.

Civilian persons on the belligerent territory 
In case the Fourth Geneva Convention is applicable, protected persons can leave the territory, unless it will be contrary to the interests of the belligerent state (i.e. men of fighting age).

Protected person shall have the possibility to appeal against the refusal of permission to leave the territory. The proceedings shall be carried in accordance with the fair trial canons.

Several limitations could be applied to the nationals of adversary party (assigned residence, internment, registration etc.), but they should be able to receive medical assistance, practice their religion, move from danger or military zone and find paid employment.

Civilian persons on occupied territories 
Occupying powers shall respect at least the following rights:

 deportations of protected persons from occupied territory is forbidden, except in case of evacuation for security reasons or for imperative military reasons; if such evacuations arise, they shall be temporary; occupying power shall never transfer its own civilian population to the occupied territory.
 in case of evacuation and transfer the Occupying power shall ensure the humane treatment and security of protected persons;
 forced labour is forbidden;
 destruction of real and personal property is forbidden;
 occupying power shall ensure and maintain food and medical supplies, as well as the medical care to the population of occupied territories.

Medical, religious and humanitarian personnel 
Medical personnel benefits from the protection of all four Geneva Conventions. In fact, this category of protected persons implement the protection of protected persons established by international humanitarian law, especially wounded and sick combatants.  They should not be attacked, but in contrary respected, kept out of danger and be free to pursue their medical or spiritual duties, unless they are used to commit the acts harmful to the enemy. This protection covers permanent, auxiliary medical personnel, chaplains, staff of National Red Cross Societies and other Voluntary Aid Societies, neutral state society if agreed with Parties to the conflict. Hospitals, medical transport, ships, units, and establishments are also protected and shall bear the distinctive emblems and marks.

Retained permanent personnel is not considered as a prisoners of war, but should benefit from at least the same protection. Auxiliary personnel shall be prisoners of war.

Women  
The Geneva Conventions grants special protection to women in all circumstances. Wounded and sick women (members of the army, prisoners of war) shall be treated taking in consideration their sex. During captivity, they should be housed in separated dormitories from men, have separate facilities, be under supervision of the women. “Women shall be especially protected against any attack on their honour, in particular against rape, enforced prostitution, or any form of indecent assault”. Pregnant women, women in childbirth, women who are breast-feeding or who have small children less than 7 years old are considered as sick and wounded.

Children 
Several provisions of the Geneva Conventions grant a special protection to the children under fifteen.

Children are protected as victims of the armed conflicts. They can benefit from special hospital and safety zones in time of peace and the outbreak of hostilities, evacuation from besieged of encircled areas. Necessary measures shall be taken in order to ensure their maintenance, exercise of the religion, education, if possible, by the persons with the same nationality. They shall benefit from the same preferential treatment as the nationals of the adversary part.

During the internment, they shall be housed separately from the adults, unless with their parents and family members. Additional food shall be given taking in consideration their physiological needs.

Also, children are protected as children-combatants. The parties of the conflict shall avoid to use them in hostilities. In case of their participation, children continue to benefit from the special protection. Death penalties shall not be executed for persons under 18 years old.

Protection during non-international armed conflicts 
Increasing number of non-international armed conflicts have been noticed after the Second World War. Theses conflicts are characterised by two factors:

 the parties of the conflict could belong to the same jurisdiction; as a consequence, it is difficult to establish when he civilians are in the hands of the enemy; 
 at least one of the parties is composed from the non governmental armed forces.

As a consequence, the main goal of the international humanitarian law is not the protection of civilians, but the protection of all non-participants of the conflict (independently of the nature of the detaining power).

Humane treatment is granted by the common article 3 of the Geneva Conventions. It forbids:

 "violence to life and person (i.e. murders and torture); 
 taking of hostages;
 outrages upon personal dignity, in particular humiliating and degrading treatment;
 the passing of sentences and the carrying out of executions without previous judgement pronounced by a regularly constituted court, affording all the judicial guarantees which are recognized as indispensable by civilized peoples."

The Additional Protocol II completes the article 3 of the Geneva Conventions adds several forbidden actions and grants to protected persons the rights to "respect for their person, honour and convictions and religious practices".

Children continue to benefit from special protection.

Additional Protocol II also prohibits the forced movements of civilians.

Relation between the end of the armed conflict and protection 
It becomes more difficult to determine the end of the armed conflict in the contemporary world, and as a consequence, the application of international humanitarian law in general and to protected persons in particular.  Wars in contemporary world rarely end with a total defeat or by real peace. However, under all circumstances, protected persons remain protected by the minimum guarantees and by international human rights law.

Sanctions 
Penal sanctions are foreseen in the Geneva Conventions for persons who committed or ordered to commit grave breaches against protected persons. The grave breaches are qualified as a sub-type of war crimes.

References

International humanitarian law